Vakoun Issouf Bayo (born 10 January 1997) is an Ivorian professional footballer who plays as a forward for Belgian club Charleroi on loan from EFL Championship club Watford, and the Ivory Coast national team. He is nicknamed The Crow.

Club career

Dunajská Streda
Bayo joined Dunajská Streda in March 2018. He made his Slovak league debut against ŠK Slovan Bratislava on 18 March 2018.

Celtic
Bayo moved to Scottish Premiership club Celtic in January 2019. He was left out of the Celtic squad for the later stages of the 2018–19 UEFA Europa League, with the club only able to register three of their four January window signings. He made his debut for Celtic against Kilmarnock on 17 February 2019, coming on as a late substitute shortly before Scott Brown scored a late winner.

Toulouse (loan)
On 12 August 2020, Bayo signed for French club Toulouse, on a one-year loan, with an additional option to buy.

Gent
On 9 July 2021, Bayo signed for Belgian First Division A club Gent on a four-year deal.

Charleroi
On 22 December 2021, Bayo agreed to join Charleroi on loan until the end of the season, with an option to buy. On 16 May 2022, Charleroi confirmed that they had exercised the option to purchase and had signed Bayo on a contract until 2026 after a successful loan spell that saw him score eleven goals in sixteen matches.

Watford
In a dubious financial act which continues to perplex watchers, on 2 July 2022, Bayo joined EFL Championship club Watford on a five-year deal.
The fee of £5m was reported to be five times the fee Charleroi paid a few weeks earlier.

Charleroi (loan)
On 30 January 2023, Bayo rejoined Charleroi on loan until the end of the season.

Career statistics

Honours
Celtic
 Scottish Premiership: 2018–19, 2019–20

References

External links
 FC DAC 1904 Dunajská Streda official club profile
 Futbalnet profile

1997 births
Living people
People from Daloa
Ivorian footballers
Association football forwards
Ivory Coast international footballers
Ligue 1 (Ivory Coast) players
Tunisian Ligue Professionnelle 1 players
Slovak Super Liga players
Scottish Professional Football League players
Ligue 2 players
Belgian Pro League players
English Football League players
Stade d'Abidjan players
Étoile Sportive du Sahel players
FC DAC 1904 Dunajská Streda players
Celtic F.C. players
Toulouse FC players
K.A.A. Gent players
R. Charleroi S.C. players
Watford F.C. players
Ivorian expatriate footballers
Ivorian expatriate sportspeople in Tunisia
Expatriate footballers in Tunisia
Ivorian expatriate sportspeople in Slovakia
Expatriate footballers in Slovakia
Ivorian expatriate sportspeople in Scotland
Expatriate footballers in Scotland
Ivorian expatriate sportspeople in France
Expatriate footballers in France
Ivorian expatriate sportspeople in Belgium
Expatriate footballers in Belgium
Ivorian expatriate sportspeople in England
Expatriate footballers in England